The Bandy World Championship for women 2012 was contested between 6 bandy playing countries. The championship was played in Irkutsk, Russia from 23 to 26 February. Sweden defeated Russia, 5-3, in the final-game.

Participating teams

Venue

Preliminary round

Standings

Play Offs

Semi-finals

Match for 5th place

Match for 3rd place

Final

Final standing

References

 VI Women's Bandy World Championship

2012
 
2012 in Russian women's sport
International bandy competitions hosted by Russia
February 2012 sports events in Europe